Tom Gilbert (born 5 August 2000) is an Australian professional rugby league footballer who plays as a er,  or  for the Dolphins in the NRL.

He has played at representative level for Queensland in the State of Origin series.

Background 
Born and raised in Brisbane, Gilbert played his junior rugby league for the Norths Devils. He attended Wavell State High School and St Patrick's College, Shorncliffe, before finishing his schooling at Brisbane Grammar School, where he was the vice-captain of their first XV rugby union team. In 2015, he joined the North Queensland Cowboys academy.

Playing career

Early career
In 2016, Gilbert played for the Norths Devils Cyril Connell Cup team and was later selected for the Queensland under-16 team. In 2017, he moved up to the Devils' Mal Meninga Cup team and represented the Queensland under-18 team. In 2018, Gilbert moved to Townsville and joined the Townsville Blackhawks. After two games for the club's Mal Meninga Cup side, he moved up to their under-20 team. Later that year he was selected again in the Queensland under-18 team.

On 16 October 2018, Gilbert re-signed with the North Queensland Cowboys, moving up to their NRL squad on a one-year development deal. In 2019, he spent the entire season playing for the Townsville Blackhawks in the Queensland Cup. In July 2019, he was named vice-captain of the Queensland under-20 team. In September 2019, he was named the Queensland Cup Rookie of the Year and was named at lock in the Team of the Year.

On 29 November 2019, Gilbert re-signed with the North Queensland outfit until the end of 2022, joining the club's top-30 squad.

2020
In Round 4 of the 2020 NRL season, Gilbert made his NRL debut for North Queensland against the Cronulla-Sutherland Sharks. Following his second NRL game, Gilbert was suspended for three weeks for a crusher tackle on New Zealand Warriors prop King Vuniyayawa.

2022
On 26 April, Gilbert signed a three-year deal with the Dolphins, returning to his hometown of Brisbane.

Achievements and accolades

Individual
Queensland Cup Rookie of the Year: 2019
Queensland Cup Team of the Year: 2019

Statistics

NRL
 Statistics are correct to the end of the 2022 season

References

External links 
 North Queensland Cowboys profile
 Townsville Blackhawks profile

2000 births
Living people
Australian rugby league players
North Queensland Cowboys players
Dolphins (NRL) players
Townsville Blackhawks players
Rugby league locks
Rugby league players from Brisbane